is a Japanese manga series written and illustrated by Hiromu Shinozuka. The series began publication in Shogakukan's Ciao manga magazine in April 2015. An anime television series by OLM, Inc. started airing in Japan from April to December 2017.

In 2018, PriPri Chi-chan!! won the 63rd Shogakukan Manga Award in the Kodomo category.

Plot
An underground-dweller named Chi-chan wanted to come to the human world in search for sweets. After he finished his objective and he wanted to come back to his home, he would be stuck on the hole where he came from. He would then be saved by a girl named Yuka Saeki, who dug the hole where Chi-chan was stuck back there, and would then take care of Chi-chan in her home.

Characters

Humans

The human protagonist. A girl that has a gentle personality and cannot resist to help someone in need. She is currently on second grade of middle school. She has a long, straight purple hair. She is good at cooking and sewing, but her naming sense is bad. She is good friends with Ara, Eimi, and Mii.

Yuka's mother. She is strict with her daughter's grades due to Yuka failing her middle school entrance exam at one time.

Yuka's male classmate who is good at claw crane games. He is one of the first human after Yuka who knows the existence of underground-dwellers. He has confessed to Yuka once, but hasn't got the answer from her yet.

Yamato's younger sister. After she met Chi-chan, she wants to play and become friends with him.

Yuka's childhood friend who is older than her. When he and Yuka was in elementary school, he used to play pranks on Yuka, which made her angry. He did this because he had a crush on Yuka, and wanted her attention.

Underground-dwellers

The dweller protagonist. An underground-dweller that had stuck on the hole he came from when he wanted to return home. His body is about a size of a crane game prize, and he has a round, yellow body. At first, he was afraid of humans because he thought that if he gets caught, he would be dissected by them. But then, since his meeting with Yuka, his judgement of humans changed.
Since the names of underground-dwellers are usually unintelligible to humans, he gets the name "Chi-chan" from Yuka, from the term , the Japanese word for underground-dweller. He has a verbal tic of  when ending his sentences.

Chi-chan's friend. He came to the human world searching for Chi-chan that went missing from the underground. He has a round, green-colored body. He gets the name "Joe" from Yuka due to his verbal tic, .

An underground dweller who respects Chi-chan.

Chi-chan's father who appeared in Episode 12. He wears a silk hat and has a mustache. He has a yellow body like his son.

Chi-chan's mother who appeared in Episode 12. She wears an apron and a skirt. She has a yellow body like her son.

Aliens

An alien girl who was rescued by Yuka when her spaceship crash landed to Earth and Yuka was climbing at the time. She can create various gadgets.

Media

Manga
The original manga series is written and illustrated by Hiromu Shinozuka, and began serialization on March 3, 2015 in the April 2015 issue of Shogakukan's Ciao magazine. The first tankōbon was released by Shogakukan on November 27, 2015. On August 31, 2018, it was announced that PriPri Chi-chan!! would end after the seventh volume in Spring 2019.

Anime
The anime adaptation is produced by OLM, Inc., directed by Takahiro Ikezoe, and written by Michihiro Tsuchiya. The series premiered on April 15, 2017 on the MBS and TBS' new Saturday morning time slot, "Anime Saturday 630" (pronounced "Anime Saturday Roku San Maru").

The anime is streamed outside of Asia by Crunchyroll.

Reception
PriPri Chi-chan!! won the 63rd Shogakukan Manga Award in the Kodomo category in 2018.

References

External links
 Official anime website 
 PriPri Chi-chan!! at Crunchyroll
 

Anime series based on manga
2017 anime television series debuts
OLM, Inc.
Shogakukan manga
Shōjo manga
Winners of the Shogakukan Manga Award for children's manga